"How Am I Supposed to Live Without You" is a song written in 1982 by Doug James and Michael Bolton. The ballad has been recorded by many artists around the world, in several languages, most notably by Bolton himself, becoming something of a modern pop standard. Instrumental versions of the song have been recorded featuring variously the piano, guitar, saxophone, pan flute, steel drum, and music box.

"How Am I Supposed to Live Without You" was supposed to be recorded by Australian duo Air Supply, but when Arista President Clive Davis asked for permission to change the lyrics of the chorus, Bolton refused, and Davis let go of the song. Subsequently Laura Branigan recorded it as written, and it became the first major hit for the two songwriters. Bolton's own rendition became a worldwide hit in early 1990.

Laura Branigan version
As the second single from Branigan's second album Branigan 2, "How Am I Supposed to Live Without You" spent three weeks at number one on the Billboard Adult Contemporary chart and peaked at number twelve on the Hot 100 in early October 1983. Branigan's single also hit the number one spot on the Adult Contemporary chart in Canada. This success came without benefit of a music video. Branigan performed the song on the syndicated music countdown show Solid Gold in late 1983 and on the popular holiday special Dick Clark's New Year's Rockin' Eve. Branigan 2 went out of print in 2004, but Branigan's original version can still be heard on the compilation albums The Best of Branigan (1995), The Essentials (2002) and The Platinum Collection (2006).

The single's B-side was a newly written song over the music to the Italian song "Mama", by Giancarlo Bigazzi and Umberto Tozzi. Branigan's first major hit had been with "Gloria", another English song written to an Italian hit by the duo.

Track listings

Charts

Weekly charts

Year-end charts

1986 lawsuit
Laura Branigan demoed songwriter Gary William Friedman's "Promise Me I'll Feel This Way Tomorrow", several years before she recorded "How Am I Supposed to Live Without You". Branigan did not meet the songwriters Michael Bolton and Doug James before the recording. In 1986, songwriter Friedman filed lawsuit against Branigan, the songwriters, and other parties involved in the recording, alleging that "How Am I Supposed to Live Without You" copied his song "Promise Me I'll Feel This Way Tomorrow". In her testimony of the August 5, 1986, trial, Branigan performed Bolton and James's song and two other songs recorded by various artists, "Will You Still Love Me Tomorrow" (recorded by Branigan for her 1984 album Self Control) and "MacArthur Park". Toward the end of August 1986, juries of a New York federal court cleared the case defendants from the charges.

Michael Bolton version

Michael Bolton recorded a version of the song for his sixth studio album, Soul Provider (1989). The single reached number one on both the Billboard Hot 100 and Adult Contemporary charts and also won Bolton a Grammy Award for Best Male Pop Vocal Performance. The release marked a turning point in Bolton's career. After years of being primarily known as a songwriter, the single got him recognition as a performer and made him a certified superstar.

Chart performance
The single debuted on the Billboard Hot 100 in October 1989. It slowly climbed the chart and by mid-January became the first new number one single of the 1990s.

Music video
Philip Rose and Greg Gold directed the song's music video. The beginning of the video shows Bolton performing the selection whilst he is sitting in his living room, and small bits of story about his and his girlfriend's relationship are told through fade-outs. As he is about to leave the apartment, already having packed his suitcases, he thinks of her and the time they spent together and seemingly decides against the decision; he then cuddles with his girlfriend. It is revealed, the next night, that he plans to give her a bracelet, which he quickly hides as he reads a newspaper before she enters the room. She surprises him with breakfast and they cuddle again. Later on, the two have a fight about something and she storms out of the apartment, and Bolton visibly feels guilty.

Track listings

Personnel
 Michael Bolton – lead vocals
 Michael Omartian – keyboards
 Michael Landau – guitar
 Neil Stubenhaus – bass
 John Keane – drums

Charts

Weekly charts

Year-end charts

Certifications

Release history

See also

 List of number-one adult contemporary singles of 1983 (U.S.) and 1990 (U.S.)
 List of Billboard Hot 100 number-one singles of 1990

References

1982 songs
1983 singles
1989 singles
1990 singles
Atlantic Records singles
Billboard Hot 100 number-one singles
Columbia Records singles
Grammy Award for Best Male Pop Vocal Performance
Laura Branigan songs
Michael Bolton songs
Ultratop 50 Singles (Flanders) number-one singles
Pop ballads
Rock ballads
Songs about loneliness
Songs written by Michael Bolton
Song recordings produced by Michael Omartian
1980s ballads